Aleksandr Aleksandrovich Putsko (born 24 February 1993) is a Russian professional football player who plays as a centre-back for Baltika Kaliningrad.

Career

Club
Putsko played for FC Spartak Moscow in the 2012–13 Russian Cup game against FC Salyut Belgorod on 26 September 2012.

Putsko made his Russian Premier League debut for FC Spartak Moscow on 23 April 2016 in a game against FC Mordovia Saransk.

On 6 August 2020, Akhmat Grozny announced the signing of Putsko to a two-year contract from Ufa.

Career statistics

Club

References

External links
 

1993 births
People from Unechsky District
Sportspeople from Bryansk Oblast
Living people
Russian footballers
Russia youth international footballers
Association football defenders
FC Spartak Moscow players
FC Spartak-2 Moscow players
FC Ufa players
FC SKA-Khabarovsk players
FC Akhmat Grozny players
FC Baltika Kaliningrad players
Russian Premier League players
Russian First League players
Russian Second League players